Walt Strony (born 1955) is an  American recording, consulting and performing organist and organ teacher, both on the theatre organ and traditional pipe organ, ranging from pizza parlors to churches and theatres to symphony orchestras.

Biography

Strony’s classical organ studies were with Herbert L. White of the Sherwood Conservatory of Music Columbia College Chicago and Karel Paukert at Northwestern University.  His theatre organ teacher was Al Melgard, famous as the Staff Organist on the Barton organ at the Chicago Stadium.  When Melgard retired in 1975 he gave Strony his Oak Park, IL teaching studio.  Strony later studied piano with Giulio Favrio of the Lyric Opera of Chicago.

He made his public debut as an organist in 1974, aged 18. During his college years he began playing the theatre organ in pizza parlors, a fad in the 1970s which gave new life to a largely forgotten instrument.  For many years thereafter he was Artist-in-Residence at First Christian Church in Las Vegas, Nevada.

Strony has studied with silent-film accompanists and has accompanied silent films for years, such as The Phantom of the Opera (1925 film) and Nosferatu at the Plaza Theatre (El Paso).

Performances

He has performed in the United States, toured extensively in Australia (1978), England (1989), Japan (Expo ‘75 & 2011), and Canada (1999), and he is a regular performer at conventions of the American Theatre Organ Society.  In 2012 he played his 39th ATOS convention, more than any other organist. He played there again in 2008. He has also performed for the American Guild of Organists on both local and national levels.

He has performed on numerous classical instruments as well, most notably having been featured in June 2009 at Macy's in Philadelphia (formerly Wanamaker’s) playing the largest operating pipe organ in the world. He has also recorded on the world’s largest theatre organ at the Sanfillipo Music Room in Barrington, IL.

In addition to solo concerts, he has performed with several symphony orchestras.  In El Paso he played music including Symphony No. 3 (Organ) of Camille Saint-Saëns.  He played at the Calgary International Organ Festival with the Calgary Philharmonic.  Additionally, he has performed with the Allentown Symphony and Symphony Silicon Valley. While in college he performed the Poulenc Organ Concerto with the Chicago Businessman’s Orchestra.

Awards

In 1991 and 1993 the American Theatre Organ Society selected him as "Organist of the Year."  He is the only living organist to have received this award twice.  In 2011 he was inducted into the American Theatre Organ Society Hall of Fame.

In the spring of 2008, and in celebration of his career, the Allen Organ Company developed the Walt Strony Signature Model - the STR-4 - which is a four-manual instrument.  Strony designed the stoplist and chose all the samples from their extensive library based upon his experience as an organist and tonal consultant.

Other work

His book The Secrets of Theatre Organ Registration (1991) was the first book to be written about this subject.  According to the New York Times, this is "what many theater organists consider the definitive guide" to Wurlitzers. TheatreOrgans.com calls it "The hands down best book ever written on the subject of Theater Organ registration. Get a copy of this if you can, it is worth its weight in gold."

In addition to musical performance, he works as an organ consultant, most notably for instruments built by the Allen Organ Company.  In collaboration with Allen Organs and the ATOS, he and four other artists recorded a five-DVD instructional video entitled “The Art of Playing Theatre Organ”.

Discography 

Walt Strony has made numerous recordings and can be heard on over 30 albums. His first recording was made in 1976 at the Chicago Theatre, where he was the first organist to play that instrument on a semi-regular basis in 25 years.

Solo Albums

With Others (CD)

Videos

References

External links

Living people
1955 births
American organists
American male organists
Theatre organists
Musicians from Chicago
Date of birth missing (living people)
Northwestern University alumni
Columbia College Chicago alumni
21st-century organists
21st-century American male musicians
21st-century American keyboardists